Hilsea railway station is a railway station on Airport Service Road, Hilsea, Portsmouth, England serving the northern end of Portsea Island, including a large industrial estate nearby. The station was once the closest to Portsmouth Airport, which was closed in 1973.

It is located on the Portsmouth Direct line which runs between London Waterloo and Portsmouth Harbour.  There were extensive sidings at Hilsea during World War II.

This railway station is mainly used by commuters who work in nearby Anchorage Park industrial estate. Only stopping trains stop here. The station is unmanned.

Historically, during the Battle of Havant, Hilsea was the terminus of an omnibus link from Havant New, just east of Havant. When the Portsmouth Direct Line had been constructed by the LSWR, at the request of the residents of Portsmouth, it was necessary that trains run from the Portcreek Junction railway triangle, to Havant Junction, along track owned by the rival LBSCR. The latter firm refused to allow that and engaged in militant obstruction of the track to prevent the running of a through train service for several months.

The road that crosses over the railway line and station at Hilsea is named Norway Road after the novelist and aeronautical engineer, Nevil Shute Norway.

Services 

The typical off-peak service in trains per hour is:
 1 tph to  via 
 1 tph to London Waterloo via 
 1 tph to 
 1 tph to 

Gallery

References

External links

Railway stations in Portsmouth
DfT Category E stations
Former Southern Railway (UK) stations
Railway stations in Great Britain opened in 1941
Railway stations served by Govia Thameslink Railway
Railway stations served by South Western Railway